Ramsar may refer to:
 Places so  named:
 Ramsar, Mazandaran, city in Iran
 Ramsar, Rajasthan, village in India
  Eponyms of the  Iranian city:
 Ramsar Convention concerning wetlands, signed in Ramsar, Iran
 Ramsar site, wetland listed in accord wth the Ramsar Convention
 Others
 Ramsar Palace, a palace in Ramsar, Mazandaran

See also 
:Category:Ramsar sites